James Bennett Bell (August 9, 1835 – June 30, 1910) was an American soldier who fought in the American Civil War and a recipient of the U.S. military's highest decoration, the Medal of Honor, for his actions at the Battle of Missionary Ridge on November 25, 1863.

Bell died on June 30, 1910 and is buried in Gettysburg, Ohio.

Medal of Honor citation

See also

List of American Civil War Medal of Honor recipients: A–F

References

1835 births
1910 deaths
People of Ohio in the American Civil War
Union Army soldiers
United States Army Medal of Honor recipients
American Civil War recipients of the Medal of Honor